The 1999 Philippine Basketball Association (PBA) Governors' Cup was the third and last conference of the 1999 PBA season. It started on October 3 and ended on December 12, 1999. The tournament is an Import-laden format, which requires an import or a pure-foreign player for each team.

Format
The following format will be observed for the duration of the conference:
One-round eliminations; 8 games per team.
Quarterfinals: top 4 seeded teams will have twice-to-beat advantage
QF1: #1 vs. #8
QF2: #2 vs. #7 
QF3: #3 vs. #6 
QF4: #4 vs. #5
Best-of-five semifinals: winners of each pairings
QF1 vs QF4
QF2 vs.QF3
For third-place: one-game playoff 
Finals: best-of-seven series

Elimination round

Team standings

Schedule
Correct as of November 10, 1999

Bracket

Quarterfinals

(1) Purefoods vs. (8) Barangay Ginebra

(2) Tanduay vs. (7) Mobiline

(3) San Miguel vs. (6) Sta. Lucia

(4) Alaska vs. (5) Shell

Semifinals

(1) Purefoods vs. (4) Alaska

(2) Tanduay vs. (3) San Miguel

Third place playoff

Finals

References

External links
 PBA.ph

Governors' Cup
PBA Governors' Cup